Roscoe Divine (born November 3, 1947) is a retired American track and field athlete.  He was known primarily as a miler but excelled in shorter distances like the 880 yard (800 meters) and in the steeplechase.

He ran track for the University of Oregon under Bill Bowerman. He was part of a collection of sub-4 minute milers that collected around Bowerman around that time, when the number of people accomplishing the feat was relatively small.  He lettered in track in 1967, 1968, 1969, and 1970.  He lettered in cross country in 1969.  He was runner-up in the 1500 meters at the 1968 USA Outdoor Track and Field Championships.

He was ranked in the United States top 10 five times, the best being #3 in 1967.

Records 

1968 World Record holder : 4-mile relay (Oregon Track Club)Roscoe Divine (4:03.2) (USA)Wade Bell (4:01.0) (USA)Arne Kvalheim (4:03.3) (NOR)David Wilborn (3:57.5) (USA)16:05.0

References

External links
Duck Record Holders 
 Photo with Steve Prefontaine

Living people
1947 births
World record setters in athletics (track and field)
University of Oregon alumni
Oregon Ducks men's track and field athletes